Sirimongkol Singmanasak (born 2 March 1977) is a Thai professional boxer, bare-knuckle boxer and kickboxer. He is a world champion in two weight classes, having held the WBC bantamweight title in 1997 and the WBC super-featherweight title from 2002 to 2003. His other names were Sirimongkol Nakhon Thong Park View (ศิริมงคล นครทองปาร์ควิว), Sirimongkol Singwancha (ศิริมงคล สิงห์วังชา), Sirimongkol Nakornloung (ศิริมงคล นครหลวงโปรโมชั่น), and Sirimongkhon Iamthuam (ศิริมงคล เอี่ยมท้วม).

Biography and boxing career 
He was born into a family whose father owned the "Singmanasak Boxing Gym" (ค่ายมวยสิงห์มนัสศักดิ์). His older brother used to compete in Muay Thai under the ring name "Manopchai Singmanasak" (มานพชัย สิงห์มนัสศักดิ์) and his younger sister was once a female Muay Thai kickboxer. During his childhood, Sirimongkol enjoyed performing in the Thai folk theatre form Likay (ลิเก; Thai traditional dance), which involved both singing and dancing. Under concerns that he would become a Katoey (กะเทย; Thai transgender), Sirimongkol's father forced him to take up boxing, which he initially disliked.

He began competing in the amateur boxing tournament in highschool division before turning pro. He won the WBU Super flyweight and Bantamweight titles in 1995. In August 1996, he became the WBC Bantamweight Champion, by challenging interim champion José Luis Bueno of Mexico at Phitsanulok Provincial Stadium, Phitsanulok province. At the age of 19, he scored a fifth-round knockout in impressive fashion. He had qualified for the title shot with a victory over Thanomsak Sithbaobay aka Khaoyai Maha Sarakham (ถนอมศักดิ์ ศิษย์โบ๊เบ๊, เขาใหญ่ มหาสารคาม), an elder Thai boxer who had unsuccessfully challenged for the world championship three times.

He defended the WBC bantamweight title three times before losing the title to former Japanese world champion Joichiro Tatsuyoshi in November 1997 at Osaka-jō Hall in Osaka, Japan. 

Sirimongkol then put together another impressive winning streak and won the vacant WBC Super featherweight title when he defeated Kengo Nagashima on August 24, 2002 by knockout in second round. He held the title for one year before he lost to Jesús Chávez.

In 2009, he was arrested for possession of Ya ba (ยาบ้า; tablets of methamphetamine and caffeine popular in Thailand). While incarcerated in prison, he was responsible for teaching boxing to other inmates. During this time he still boxed and won the WBC Asia Intercontinental Welterweight title. He was pardoned 4 years into his 20-year sentence.

In 2017, he would suffer his first defeat in 14 years to Uzbek boxer Azizbek Abdugofurov.

Bare-knuckle boxing
Sirimongkol was scheduled to make his bare-knuckle boxing debut at BKFC Thailand 1: The Game Changer on December 18, 2021. His opponent was Iranian Brazilian jiu-jitsu and full contact karate practitioner Reza Goodary. Despite being the shorter fighter by 27 centimeters, Sirimongkol was in control of the majority of the fight and went on to win via split decision.

Sirimongkol is scheduled to face Mike Vetrila for the inaugural BKFC Thailand Light Heavyweight Championship at BKFC Thailand 2: Iconic Impact on May 7, 2022. He won the close fight via majority decision to become the first BKFC Thailand Light Heavyweight Champion.

Entertainment career
With a good-looking young man and famous, he earned the alias Teppabud na yok (เทพบุตรหน้าหยก, "handsome divinity") from Thai boxing fans. After he lost WBC world title to Tatsuyoshi in late 1997. He was persuaded to enter the showbiz. He has some works, such as being a model for the cover of a fashion magazine for women, co-starred in certain TV dramas or movies, such as Pret Wat Suthat on Channel 7 (2003), a Thai  martial arts film Choocolate (2008), included co-starred in the rock band Motive's MV with Dom Hetrakul, etc.

In 2005, he was scandalized by nude photo. When police officers have detected a pornographic book for gay sold at Or Tor Kor Market opposite Chatuchak Weekend Market, which has his photos in those books as well.

Professional boxing record

Bare knuckle record

|-
|Win
|align=center|2–0
|Mike Vetrila
|Decision (majority) 
|BKFC Thailand 2
|
|align=center|5
|align=center|2:00
|Pattaya, Thailand
| 
|-
|Win
|align=center|1–0
|Reza Goodary
|Decision (split) 
|BKFC Thailand 1
|
|align=center|5
|align=center|2:00
|Pattaya, Thailand
|
|-

See also
List of world bantamweight boxing champions
List of world super-featherweight boxing champions

References

External links

|-

1977 births
Living people
Sirimongkol Singmanasak
Sirimongkol Singmanasak
Super-flyweight boxers
Bantamweight boxers
Super-featherweight boxers
Lightweight boxers
Light-welterweight boxers
Welterweight boxers
Light-middleweight boxers
Middleweight boxers
World bantamweight boxing champions
World super-featherweight boxing champions
World Boxing Council champions
Welterweight kickboxers
Sirimongkol Singmanasak
Bare-knuckle boxers 
Sirimongkol Singmanasak
Sirimongkol Singmanasak
Sirimongkol Singmanasak
Sirimongkol Singmanasak